This is a links page to the named waterfalls found in the UK and includes a list of the highest waterfalls.

Highest waterfalls in the UK 

The list of highest waterfalls is often controversial, due to the ambiguity of whether to measure the single largest fall or the sum of a series of falls, and many falls make false claims to the record.
This table measures above-ground waterfalls by tallest single drop (not necessarily unbroken).

List of waterfalls

England
A more complete list of waterfalls in England is available at List of waterfalls of England.

Aira Force
Ashgill Force
Aysgarth Falls
Becky Falls
Broada Falls
Canonteign Falls
Catrake Force
Catrigg Force
Cauldron Falls
Cautley Spout
Clampitt Falls
Colwith Force
Cotter Force
Doe Tor Falls
East Gill Force
Esk Falls
Falling Foss
Gaping Gill
Golitha Falls
Carmine Falls
Gordale Scar
Hardraw Force
Hellgill Force
High Force
Hollowbrook Waterfall
Horeshoe Falls
Ingleton Falls
Janet's Foss
Kinder Downfall
Kisdon Force 
Lady Exmouth Falls
Linton Falls
Lodore Falls
Low Force
Mallyan Spout
Moss Force
Pecca Falls
Raddick Hill Falls
Richmond Falls
Ritson's Force
Rival Falls
Rutter Force
Rydal Falls
Scale Force 
Scaleber Force
Shavercombe Falls
Sherrycombe Waterfall
Skelwith Force
Stainforth Force
Stanley Force
Summerhill Force
Taylorgill Force
The Cascades
Thornton Force
Wain Wath Force
Whitelady Waterfall
Stock Ghyll Force
St Nectan's Glen

Scotland
A more complete list of waterfalls in Scotland is available at List of waterfalls of Scotland.

Eas a' Chual Aluinn
Eas an Fhir Mhoir, River Etive
Eas Bàn (on tributary of Machrie Water, Arran)
Eas Coire nan Choire, Kinlochhourn
Eas Mòr (Auchenhew, Arran)
Easan Laogh, tributary of River Creran
Falls of Bruar
Falls of Dochart
Falls of Foyers
Falls of Moness
Glenashdale Falls (a.k.a. Eas a' Chranaig, Whiting Bay, Arran)
Grey Mare's Tail, Moffat
Grey Mare's Tail, Kinlochmore
Linn of Avon, Cairngorm Mountains
Linn of Dee, Inverey
Linn of Quoich, Braemar
Plodda Falls, Glen Affric
Rogie Falls
Spout of Garnock
Steall Waterfall

Wales
A more complete list of waterfalls in Wales is available at List of waterfalls of Wales.

Aber Falls, Abergwyngregyn
Cenarth Falls, River Teifi
Conwy Falls
Dolgoch Falls
Dyserth Falls
Ffrwd Fawr, Powys
Pwll-y-Gerwyn
The Grey Mare's Tail
Henrhyd Waterfall
Horseshoe Falls
Llech Sychryd, tributary of Afon Cynon
Machno falls, Afon Machno
Melincourt Falls
Mynach Falls, Afon Mynach
Pistyll Cain, Afon Gain
Pistyll Du, tributary of Afon Gain
Pistyll Gwyn, Afon Crawcwellt
Pistyll Gwyn, Afon Pumryd, River Dovey
Pistyll Henfynachlog, Afon Eiddon, Afon Wnion
Pistyll y Llyn, Llyfnant
Pistyll Rhaeadr
Pistyll Rhyd-y-meinciau, Afon Eiddew
Pistyll y Gaseg, Porth Ysgo Gwynedd
Pwll y Crochan, Sychryd
Rhaeadr-bach, Aber
Rhaeadr Cynfal, Afon Cynfal
Rhaeadr y Cwm, Afon Cynfal
Rhaeadr Du, Afon Prysor
Rhaeadr Du, Afon Gamlan
Rhaeadr Mawddach, Afon Mawddach
Rhaeadr Ogwen, Afon Ogwen
Sgwd Clun-gwyn
Sgwd Ddwli Isaf
Sgwd Ddwli Uchaf
Sgwd Isaf Clun-gwyn
Sgwd Einion Gam
Sgwd Gwladus
Sgwd y Bedol
Sgwd yr Eira
Sgwd y Pannwr
Swallow Falls, Afon Llugwy

Northern Ireland
Waterfalls in Northern Ireland.

Ess na Larach, Glenariff Forest Park
Ess na Crub, Inver River, Glenariff Forest Park

See also 

Geography of the United Kingdom
List of waterfalls

Waterfalls